Bach Collegium Japan (BCJ) is composed of an orchestra and a chorus specializing in Baroque music, playing on period instruments. It was founded in 1990 by Masaaki Suzuki with the purpose of introducing Japanese audiences to European Baroque music; Suzuki is still the music director. The ensemble has recorded all of Bach’s cantatas, a project that extended from 1995 to 2018 and accounts for over half of its discography.

History
The ensemble was founded in 1990 by Masaaki Suzuki who is still its music director  Since then, they have become sought-after performers, collaborating  with European artists such as  Max van Egmond, Nancy Argenta, Christoph Prégardien, Peter Kooy, Hana Blažíková, Monika Frimmer, Michael Chance, Kai Wessel, Gerd Türk, Michael Schopper and Concerto Palatino.

They have toured Asia, Europe and North America, with many performances as cultural festivals  such as Edinburgh Festival, the Hong Kong Arts Festival, the Festival Internacional Cervantino the Bach Festival in Leipzig, the Oregon Bach Festival and the Boston Early Music Festival.

Five years after the Collegium was founded, they began a project to record all the Bach cantatas, finishing in 2013. Working with Swedish record label BIS, the work was performed at a Christian chapel at Kobe University, one of the few Christian churches in the country large enough to properly perform such works. These recordings account for over half of the ensemble’s 99-album discography.

The ensemble
The Collegium is based in Tokyo and Kobe, with the aim of introducing Japanese audiences to Baroque music on period instruments. It consists of a Baroque orchestra and chorus with about twenty voices and about 25 instrumentalists at any given performance. Unlike most Japanese orchestras, it has some female section-leaders, and it draws on a hand-picked group of European instrumentalists. The vocal soloists are also a mix of Japanese and foreign, Suzuki's argument being that if the Collegium employed only Europeans, there would be little to distinguish it from other period ensembles.

Masaaki Suzuki
Masaaki Suzuki (b. 1954) founded the collegium after being invited to inaugurate a hall in Osaka, bringing together two ensembles already under his direction. Suzuki is a pioneer of early-music performance in East Asia and an international Bach authority. He graduated Tokyo National University of Fine Arts and Music and later attended the Sweelinck Conservatory in Amsterdam, studying under Piet Kee and Ton Koopman.

Artistry
The focus of the ensemble, for which they are noted, is the works of Bach and those Protestant German composers that influenced him such as Dietrich Buxtehude, Heinrich Schütz, Johann Hermann Schein and Georg Böhm. Best known for their performances of Bach’s  Cantatas, they have also performed his Passions, as well  as Handel’s Messiah and Monteverdi's Vespers. Most of these works are for a full chorus, but it also presents smaller programs for soloists and small vocal groups.

Alex Ross identifies Suzuki’s approach to Bach’s music as falling between two extremes, that of large ensembles (now regarded as old-fashioned in this repertoire), and on the other hand that of purists with one voice per part. According to Ross, Suzuki's interpretations tend towards subtlety rather than flamboyance avoiding "abrupt accents, florid ornaments, and freewheeling tempos that are fashionable in Baroque performance practice". Ross praises Suzuki's clarity and musicality but suggests that at times the performances can seem to lack force. The BBC reviewed a 2013 release in the cantata series as "Fluently stylish and idiomatic, the performers live and breathe Bach's music with as much immediacy as if it had been composed yesterday".

Members
Concertmaster (violin, viola and viola d'amore): Ryo Terakado

Sopranos

 Hana Blažíková
 Minae Fujisaki
 Yoshie Hida
 Tamiko Hoshi
 Mihoko Hoshikawa
 Naoco Kaketa
 Yumiko Kurisu
 Joanne Lunn
 Aki Matsui
 Dorothee Mields
 Sachiko Muratani
 Rachel Nicholls
 Yukari Nonoshita
 Carolyn Sampson
 Eri Sawae
 Mikiko Suzuki
 Aki Yanagisawa

Altos

 Hiroya Aoki
 Yuko Anazawa
 Pascal Bertin
 Robin Blaze
 Mutsumi Hatano
 Yoshikazu Mera
 Toshiharu Nakajima
 Claudia Schmitz
 Tamaki Suzuki
 Akira Tachikawa
 Chiharu Takahashi
 Yukie Tamura
 Sumihito Uesugi
 Matthew White
 Makiko Yamashita

Tenors

 Yusuke Fujii
 Hiroto Ishikawa
 Takayuki Kagami
 Koki Katano
 Jan Kobow
 Wolfram Lattke
 Satoshi Mizukoshi
 Katsuhiko Nakashima
 Takanori Onishi
 Makoto Sakurada
 Michio Shimada
 Jun Suzuki
 Yosuke Taniguchi
 Akira Takizawa
 Gerd Türk
 Andreas Weller

Basses

 Daisuke Fujii
 Jun Hagiwara
 Yoshiya Hida
 Toru Kaku
 Peter Kooy
 Tetsuya Odagawa
 Yoshitaka Ogasawara
 Tetsuya Oi
 Kazuhiko Ono
 Naoki Sasaki
 Chiyuki Urano
 Yusuke Watanabe
 Roderick Williams
 Dominik Wörner
 Seiji Yoshikawa.

References

Mixed early music groups
Japanese orchestras
Japanese choirs
Musical groups established in 1990
Bach choirs
Bach music ensembles
1990 establishments in Japan